A meteor procession occurs when an Earth-grazing meteor breaks apart, and the fragments travel across the sky in the same path. According to physicist Donald Olson, only four occurrences are known:

 18 August 1783 Great Meteor
 20 July 1860 Great Meteor; believed by Olson to be the event referred to in Walt Whitman's poem Year of Meteors, 1859–60
 21 December 1876 Great Meteor; sighted over Kansas, Missouri, Illinois, Indiana, Ohio, Pennsylvania
 9 February 1913 Great Meteor Procession; a chain of slow, large meteors moving from northwest to southeast, sighted over North America, particularly in Canada, the North Atlantic and the Tropical South Atlantic

See also 

 1972 Great Daylight Fireball
 Bolide
 Comet breakup
 Forensic astronomy
 Green fireballs
 List of Earth-crossing asteroids
 Meteor shower
 Unidentified flying object

References

External links 
 Meteors, Meteoroids, and Meteorites

Meteoroids